Gulhi (Dhivehi: ގުޅި) is one of the inhabited islands of Kaafu Atoll. It is located in the South Malé Atoll close to Maafushi island and connected daily except Friday by MTCC public transport ferry.

Geography

Demography

References

Islands of the Maldives